Charles A. Sinsel (5 June 1864 - 8 December 1923) was the Republican president of the West Virginia Senate from Taylor County and served from 1919 to 1921.

References 

West Virginia state senators
Presidents of the West Virginia State Senate

1864 births
1923 deaths